Eduard Ferdinand Geiseler (21 September 1781 in Stettin – 1827) was a German botanist who worked as a physician in Danzig.

He is known for his investigations involving the genus Croton, of which he circumscribed numerous species. In 1807 he published a monograph on the genus, titled Crotonis monographiam.

In 1841 Johann Friedrich Klotzsch named the genus Geiseleria (family Euphorbiaceae) in his honor.

References

External links 

19th-century German botanists
Scientists from Szczecin
1781 births
1827 deaths
Physicians from Gdańsk